Molitor & Kuzmin are a collaborative duo of visual artists, who are classified as light art and installation artists.

Life and work
Ursula Molitor (born June 6, 1947, in Hermannsburg, Lower-Saxony) is a German artist, graphic designer and light artist. She studied graphic design in Hamburg and later worked as a graphic artist and illustrator. Since 1983 she has been working as a freelance artist in Cologne, Germany.

Vladimir Kuzmin (born October 16, 1943, in Zaporizhchja, Soviet Union, today Ukraine) is a Russian artist. He studied architecture in Moscow and worked as a freelance artist in the field of painting and graphic design in Moscow. Since 1992 he has been living and working in Cologne.

Since 1996, together they have formed the artist duo Molitor & Kuzmin. In their installations and Light art objects they work with the play of light and shadow, with contrasts and paradoxes. Preferred materials include fluorescent lamps that they deploy like modules, as design elements of their artworks. At a remove from their original meaning, these modules are combined into artefacts, whose technical character and materiality appear to dissolve in radiant brightness, resulting in a work which presents light: Die Leuchtstoffröhre ist Form und Farbe zugleich. (in English: The fluorescent tube is form and colour as well.)

Collections 

 Kunstmuseum Celle, Celle, Germany
 Artothek Kunstmuseum Villa Zanders, Bergisch Gladbach, Germany
 Collection Kunstmuseum Villa Zanders, Bergisch-Gladbach, Germany
 Sparkasse KölnBonn, Cologne, Germany
 IKK Bundesverband, Bergisch Gladbach, Germany
 Sammlung Schroth, Soest, Deutschland
 L'Association Mouvement Art Contemporain (AMAC), Chamalières, France
 ART4.RU Contemporary Art Museum, Moscow, Russia
 Moscow Museum of Modern Art (MMOMA), Moscow, Russia
 National Centre for Contemporary Arts, Moscow, Russia

Nominations
 2004: Light Art Prize LUX US, City Museum of Lüdenscheid, Germany
 2010: International André-Evard Art Award, Kunsthalle Messmer, Riegel, Germany
 2015: International Lucas-Cranach-Prize, Kronach, Germany
 2016: International André-Evard Art Award, Kunsthalle Messmer, Riegel, Germany

Art in public places 

 2009: Ohne Titel, Light art Installation im Dachgiebel, Kunstmuseum Celle, Celle, Germany
 2016: Ein Pilgerstab für Soest, Light art Installation, Soest, Germany

Solo exhibitions (selection) 

 1996: LichtZeit, Evangelische Gnadenkirche, Bergisch Gladbach, Germany
 1998: Schnittpunkt-Lichtinstallation, Antoniterkirche, Cologne, Germany
 1999: Galleria Fioretto Arte Contemporanea, Padua, Italy 
 2000: Video- und Light art Installation, St. Gereon's Basilica, Cologne, Germany
 2000: Millennium, St.Petri Kirche Lübeck, Lübeck, Germany
 2000: ZeitRäume, Kunstmuseum Villa Zanders, Bergisch Gladbach, Germany
 2001: Light,  Galleria Fioretto Arte Contemporanea, Padua, Italy
 2001: Light art Installation in Porta Savonarola, Padua, Italy
 2003: Fiat Lux,  Galerie Schröder und Dörr, Bergisch Gladbach, Germany
 2006: Fiat Lux, Krokin Gallery, Moscow, Russia
 2007: Light Time, Parallel program to the 2. Biennale Moscow, Krokin Gallery, Russia
 2007: Paradisi Gloria - 4 Licht-und Videoinstallationen zu den Konzerten, Münchner Rundfunkorchester, Herz-Jesu-Kirche, Munich, Germany
 2008: In a different Light, Shchusev Museum of Architecture,), Moscow, Russia
 2009: Mehr Licht, Galerie Schröder und Dörr, Bergisch Gladbach, Germany
 2010: ÖffentLicht, Kunstmuseum Villa Zanders Bergisch Gladbach, Germany
 2010: Requiem, Projekt im Tschechow-Theater, Moscow, Russia
 2010: Photosynthese, Galerie Schreier & von Metternich, Düsseldorf, Germany
 2010: Et fact est Lux,  White Square Gallery, Berlin, Deutschland
 2012: Koordinaten, Kunstverein Region Dahlenburg, Dahlenburg Germany
 2016: Take me to the Light, Galerie Floss & Schultz, Cologne, Germany

Group exhibitions (selection)

 2000: Raumüberschreitungen - Visionen zum Weltall, Galerie Inge Baecker, Cologne, Germany (a.o. with Ugo Dossi, Reinhardt Heinen, Curt Stenvert, Karlheinz Stockhausen, UnterbezirksDada)
 2000: Große Kunstausstellung, Haus der Kunst, Munich, Germany
 2000: ZeitRäume, Kunstmuseum Villa Zanders, Bergisch Gladbach, Germany, (a.o. with Hanne Darboven, Douglas Allsop, Madeleine Dietz)  
 2002: Centre for International Light Art, Eindhoven, Netherlands
 2005: De Kunst van TL (Tube Luminescent), Centre for International Light Art, Eindhoven, Netherlands
 2006: Lichtrouten Luedenscheid, Lüdenscheid, Germany
 2006: KunstLichtTore Bochum, Bochum, Germany
 2007: Signaal, Centre for International Light Art, Eindhoven, Netherlands
 2008: Pas de deux - Wie sich die Bilder gleichen. 15 Jahre Artothek, Artothek Kunstmuseum Villa Zanders, Bergisch-Gladbach, Germany
 2009: Lichtwelten, Weltenlicht, Galerie Inge Baecker* 2009: Lichtwelten, Weltenlicht, Galerie Inge Baecker, Bad Münstereifel, Germany (with Rosa M. Hessling) 
 2009:  Leuchtzeichen, Kunstmuseum Celle, Celle, Germany (with Jan van Munster)
2010: Lichtungen, Internationales Lichtkunstfestival, Hildesheim, Germany (a.o. with  Andreas Bunte, Francesco Mariotti, Marek Radke,  Regine Schumann, Gerd Winner)
 2011: Parcours 11 - Teil I Berlin!Berlin!, Automobilforum Unter den Linden, Berlin, Germany (a.o. with Heinrich Maria Davringhausen, Georg Baselitz, Joseph Beuys, Jörg Immendorff, Markus Lüpertz, A.R. Penck, Sigmar Polke, Wolf Vostell)
 2012: Glow 2012, Centre for International Light Art, Eindhoven, Netherlands
 2013: Firmament, Krokin Gallery, together with the planetarium of the city of Moscow, Russia
 2013: Ceci n'est pas une Lampe..., Gesellschaft für Kunst und Gestaltung, Bonn, Germany (a.o. with François Morellet, Jan van Munster)
 2013: Scheinwerfer – European Lightart, Kunstmuseum Celle, Celle, Germany (with Jürgen Albrecht, Tim Berresheim, Urs Breitenstein, Klaus Geldmacher, Andrea Thembie Hannig,  Detlef Hartung und Georg Trenz, Daniel Hausig, Margareta Hesse, Christoph Hildebrand, Hans Kotter, Siegfried Kreitner, Mischa Kuball, Vollrad Kutscher, Stefanie Lampert, Heinz Mack, Francesco Mariotti, Jakob Mattner, Chris Nägele, Otto Piene, Stephan Reusse, Susanne Rottenbacher, Max Sudhues, Timm Ulrichs, Nils Völker, Rosmarie Weinlich, Claudia Wissmann, Achim Wollscheid)
 2013: Vielfalt statt Einfalt. 20 Jahre Artothek Kunstmuseum Villa Zanders, Kunstmuseum Villa Zanders, Bergisch Gladbach, Deutschland
 2014: Lucida Space,  National Centre for Contemporary Arts (NCCA), Moscow, Russiad (a.o. with Ilya Kabakow, Erik Wladimirowitsch Bulatow, John Cage)
2015: Lichtungen, Internationales Lichtkunstfestival, Hildesheim, Germany
 2015: Danke Berlin. 200 Jahre Preußen am Rhein, Kreishausfoyer, Bergisch Gladbach (later also shown in Art cabinet Hespert), Germany
 2017: Signal. Lichtkunst aus der Sammlung Robert Simon, Kunstmuseum Celle, Celle, Germany (with a.o. Klaus Geldmacher, Daniel Hausig, Albert Hien, Christoph Hildebrand, Kazuo Katase, Hans Kotter, Brigitte Kowanz, Siegfried Kreitner, Mischa Kuball, Francesco Mariotti, Otto Piene, Stephan Reusse, Susanne Rottenbacher, Max Sudhues, Timm Ulrichs)
 2017: On Target, Exhibition in the framework of European Capital of Culture Paphos 2017, Paphos, Cyprus   
 2017: //Responsive: International Light Art Project Halifax, NSCAD University , Halifax, Canada
 2017/2018: ¡Bright!, Centre for International Light Art, Unna, Germany
 2018: Collumina - Internationales Licht Kunst Projekt Köln, Cologne, Germany

Further reading 
 
  (Darin enthalten ein Artikel mit Abbildung zur Ausstellung von Molitor&Kuzmin im Römerturm/Galerie Inge Baecker im Jahr 2000)

References

External links 
 Website of the artists
 
 Catalog of the exhibition Take me to the Light, 2016
 

Art duos
Light artists
Concrete art
German installation artists
German contemporary artists
Living people
Year of birth missing (living people)